Abraham Silvers (born 29 April 1934 in Bronx, New York) is an American mathematician and statistician who has written extensively on research methods and approaches to clinical trials, medical studies and environmental risk assessment. Silvers received his PhD under the supervision of Leo Sario from the University of California, Los Angeles in 1964.

He was elected a Fellow of the American Statistical Association (ASA) in 1988 for his contributions to clinical trial and health risk assessment methodology, and in 1993, ASA awarded him a Distinguished Medal for his work in environmental statistics.

Publications
He has co-authored and published over 100 articles including:
 1964: Dissertation: Differential Geometric Methods in the Study of Mappings into Abstract Riemann Surfaces
 1968: Insulin delivery rate into plasma in normal and diabetic subjects
 1978: A prospective evaluation of the leukocyte adherence inhibition test in colorectal cancer and its correlation with carcinoembryonic antigen levels
 1984: Pharmacokinetics in Low Dose Extrapolation Using Animal Cancer Data
 1986: Proceedings : new directions on the extrapolation of health risks from animals to man
 1998:Influence of Prenatal Mercury Exposure Upon Scholastic and Psychological Test Performance: Benchmark Analysis of a New Zealand Cohor
 2009, Ian I. Mitroff and Abraham Silvers, ''Dirty Rotten Strategies: How We Trick Ourselves and Others into Solving the Wrong Problems Precisely, Stanford Business Press (2009), hardcover, 210 pages, 
 2010: New direction for enhancing quality in diabetes care: utilizing telecommunications and paraprofessional outreach workers backed by an expert medical team

References

External links

1934 births
Living people
American statisticians
Fellows of the American Statistical Association